The flight endurance record is the longest amount of time an aircraft of a particular category spent in flight without landing. It can be a solo event, or multiple people can take turns piloting the aircraft, as long as all pilots remain in the aircraft. The limit initially was the amount of fuel that could be stored for the flight, but aerial refueling extended that parameter.  Due to safety concerns, the Fédération Aéronautique Internationale (FAI) no longer recognizes new records for the duration of crewed airplane or glider flights and has never recognized any duration records for helicopters.

Aeroplane

Non-refueled, crewed

Refueled, crewed

Airline, scheduled
Not an FAI category. See Longest Flights

Aeroplane, uncrewed
FAI does not differentiate between non-refueled and solar aircraft. Class U : Experimental

Helicopter

Crewed, non-refueled

Uncrewed

Free balloon, crewed

Airship

Glider

Space station, crewed
Duration that a specific person continuously occupies the spacecraft while in orbit.

See Also Timeline of longest spaceflights, List of spaceflight records

Aerospacecraft, orbital, crewed

See also
Flight distance record

Notes

References

Aviation records